Chiocci is an Italian surname. Notable people with the surname include:

Steph Chiocci (born 1988), Australian rules footballer
Xavier Chiocci (born 1990), French rugby union player

Italian-language surnames